"Zorra" is a song recorded by Spanish singer Bad Gyal. It was released by Aftercluv Dance Lab and Interscope Records on 12 December 2019. It was written by Bad Gyal, Scott Storch and Te Whiti Warbrick, and produced by Sickdrumz and Scott Storch. Considered a feminist song, Bad Gyal reappropiates Spanish misogynistic slur  and uses it on an unfaithful man.

Music video
The accompanying music video for "Zorra" was released along with the song on 12 December 2019 on Bad Gyal's YouTube channel. The video was produced by Canada, and directed by Manson.

Credits and personnel
Credits adapted from Tidal.

 Bad Gyal – vocals, songwriting
 Scott Storch – songwriting, production, keyboards
 Te Whiti Warbrick – songwriting
 Sickdrumz – production
 John Greenham – mastering

Charts

Weekly charts

Year-end charts

Certifications

Remix

On 21 January 2021 Bad Gyal released a remix of "Zorra" along with Puerto Rican singer Rauw Alejandro. Shortly after the song release, Bad Gyal was criticized for choosing a man instead of a woman for a remix of the song; "Zorra", some say, lost meaning with the collaboration.

Music video
The accompanying music video for "Zorra (remix)" was released along with the song on 21 January 2021. The video was directed by Pawla Casanovas and Javier Peralvo.

Release history

References

2019 singles
2019 songs
2021 singles
Bad Gyal songs
Interscope Records singles
Male–female vocal duets
Music controversies
Music videos shot in Spain
Songs about infidelity
Songs with feminist themes
Songs written by el Guincho
Songs written by Rauw Alejandro
Songs written by Scott Storch
Song recordings produced by el Guincho
Song recordings produced by Scott Storch
Spanish-language songs
Universal Music Group singles